KARE (channel 11) is a television station licensed to Minneapolis, Minnesota, United States, serving the Twin Cities area as an NBC affiliate. Owned by Tegna Inc., the station maintains studios on Olson Memorial Highway (MN 55) in Golden Valley and a transmitter at the Telefarm site in Shoreview, Minnesota.

History

Early years
Channel 11 signed on the air in 1953 with its broadcast hours split between WTCN-TV in Minneapolis and WMIN-TV in St. Paul; the WTCN-TV callsign was originally used by the Minneapolis-licensed channel 4 from that station's sign-on in 1949 to 1952; channel 4 changed to WCCO-TV when, in August 1952, Twin Cities Newspapers (a partnership between the Minneapolis Tribune and the Saint Paul Pioneer Press-Dispatch) divested its broadcast properties. The television station was sold to a new company, Midwest Radio and Television, which was created for the purchase, with CBS as a minority partner. CBS at the time owned WCCO radio; with the purchase of the TV station, channel 4's calls were changed to match the radio cousins. Meanwhile, the Twin Cities Newspapers radio properties, WTCN (1280 AM) and WTCN-FM (97.1, now KTCZ-FM), were sold to the Minnesota Television Service Corporation headed by Saint Paul businessman Robert Butler, a former ambassador to Cuba and Australia. Soon afterward, Butler's group and the owner of WMIN radio submitted separate applications for the new channel 11 construction permit. Because the Federal Communications Commission (FCC) had a backlog of contested licenses, the two parties submitted a joint application to share the allocation in hopes of expediting its processing and approval.

The FCC approved this deal and WTCN-TV/WMIN-TV went on the air on September 1, 1953, as an ABC affiliate. The station also carried a secondary affiliation with DuMont. During the late 1950s, the station also was briefly affiliated with the NTA Film Network. Under the agreement, the stations shared a transmitter mounted atop the Foshay Tower in downtown Minneapolis, alternating use every two hours. WTCN-TV's studios were in the Calhoun Beach Hotel in Minneapolis near Lake Calhoun, while WMIN-TV was based in the Hamm Building in downtown Saint Paul. On April 3, 1955, with FCC approval, WMIN sold its share of channel 11, making the frequency solely WTCN-TV. On the same day, the WTCN stations were sold to the Bitner Group. Two years later, the Bitner group merged with Time-Life.

The early draw of WTCN-TV was its children's programs that featured characters like J. P. Patches, Skipper Daryl, Captain 11 (originally played by Jim Lange), Sergeant Scotty, Wrangler Steve (Steve Cannon, who would later become one of WCCO radio's biggest draws) and the most popular of all, Casey Jones, a train engineer played by Roger Awsumb and accompanied by his sidekick, Joe the Cook (Chris Wedes), succeeded by Roundhouse Rodney (Lynn Dwyer). The Lunch With Casey show originated on WMIN-TV and was on the channel 11 schedule from 1954 until 1972.

On April 16, 1961, KMSP-TV (channel 9) took the ABC affiliation and WTCN-TV became an independent station. As a traditional general entertainment station, channel 11 offered cartoons, sitcoms, old movies, Minnesota Twins baseball, locally produced shows, news and drama series. It was also home to the Twin Cities' first prime-time newscast, with its 10:00 p.m. newscast moving to 9:00 p.m. Chris-Craft Industries bought WTCN-TV in 1964; WTCN radio was sold later that year by Time-Life to Buckley Broadcasting and became WWTC. Under Chris-Craft, channel 11 modernized its newscasts; up to that time, they were still shot on film.

Metromedia enters the picture

Metromedia announced its purchase of WTCN-TV from Chris-Craft in July 1971. Upon taking control of the station's operations in June 1972 Metromedia made channel 11 its fourth independent outlet, falling in line with the company's stations in New York City, Los Angeles and Washington, D.C. The new owners announced plans to upgrade channel 11's lineup of acquired programming (among the new shows added by Metromedia were The Merv Griffin Show in prime time and Wonderama on Sunday mornings) as well as make an investment in news and public affairs. In 1973, after 20 years at the Calhoun Beach Hotel, WTCN-TV moved to its current studio in Golden Valley. The address of the building was originally 441 Boone Avenue North, but is now known as 8811 Highway 55 (55427-4762)—the 11 corresponding to the station's then-analog and now virtual channel number.

The switch to NBC; Gannett takes over
In the mid-1970s, ABC—then enjoying its first run as America's top-rated television network—began looking for stronger affiliates across the country, and largely did so at the expense of third-place NBC. ABC surprised the industry in August 1978 by announcing it had signed an affiliation deal with KSTP-TV (channel 5), ending that station's 30-year relationship with NBC. NBC then chose to affiliate with WTCN-TV after rejecting an offer from former ABC affiliate KMSP-TV. The three-way switch occurred on March 5, 1979, making WTCN-TV Metromedia's first (and only) NBC affiliate.

As part of its new network affiliation status, Metromedia promised further upgrades to WTCN-TV's programming as well as a major investment in the news department. Channel 11's schedule in its first few weeks as an NBC outlet was a hodgepodge of network programs and syndicated fare the station was still obligated to run, such as Spider-Man, Tom and Jerry, I Love Lucy, The Mary Tyler Moore Show, and The PTL Club; Metromedia also recently acquired for WTCN-TV the Twin Cities' rights to Happy Days, M*A*S*H, and The Waltons.

NBC continued to struggle early in the 1980s (including the loss of the 1980 Summer Olympics to the American boycott, which resulted in the network considerably scaling back its coverage), and channel 11 suffered. The station quickly fell back to fourth place in the ratings—behind even KMSP-TV, which had replaced WTCN-TV as the Twin Cities' largest independent station and one of the most prominent in the upper Midwest—suggesting at the time that NBC's refusal to affiliate with KMSP-TV had backfired on the network locally. Metromedia would later sell about half of WTCN's cartoons and syndicated programming inventory to KMSP-TV. The station's newscasts were an even bigger concern as they drew single-digit audience shares, far behind both WCCO-TV and KSTP-TV, and utilized an underwhelming version of NBC's NewsCenter format. By coincidence, Chris-Craft would take a majority stake in KMSP-TV's parent company, United Television in 1981, pitting WTCN-TV against its former owners.

In August 1982, having grown tired of the sustained losses, Metromedia announced it was selling channel 11 to the then-Rochester, New York–based Gannett Company.

Gannett took over WTCN-TV in March 1983 and made immediate changes in the station's on-air look, and prominently made a significant investment in the station's news department; these moves enabled the station to become a factor in the Twin Cities TV ratings race. The anchor team of Paul Magers and Diana Pierce was hired that September and led the station's 10:00 p.m. newscasts for 20 years, which is a record among Twin Cities news anchors. The station's "Backyard" weather studio was also launched in 1983, following the arrival of meteorologist Paul Douglas in May.

KARE (1986–present)

On July 4, 1985, Gannett rebranded Channel 11 as WUSA, but after the company purchased WDVM-TV in Washington, D.C. later the same year, it transferred the call letters to that station on July 4, 1986, and changed channel 11's call sign on the same day to the current KARE (acquired from an AM radio station in Atchison, Kansas) that sounds like "care". The WTCN call letters now reside on the low-powered, MyNetworkTV-affiliated TV station in Palm Beach, Florida.

On April 27, 2006, KARE became the first station in the Twin Cities to broadcast its local newscasts in high definition. As part of this transition, the station completely replaced its news set, originally built in 1986 and updated in the 1990s, with a new state-of-the-art backdrop. All newscasts continued to be presented in 4:3 (standard definition) as well as simulcast in 16:9 (high definition) until the federally mandated digital transition on June 12, 2009.

Around the first week of October 2012, Gannett entered a dispute against Dish Network regarding compensation fees and Dish's AutoHop commercial-skip feature on its Hopper digital video recorders. Gannett ordered that Dish discontinue AutoHop on the account that it is affecting advertising revenues for KARE. Gannett threatened to suspend KARE's contract with the satellite provider should the skirmish continue beyond October 7 and Dish and Gannett fail to reach an agreement. The two parties eventually reached an agreement after extending the deadline for a few hours.

On June 29, 2015, the Gannett Company split in two, with one side specializing in print media and the other side specializing in broadcast and digital media. KARE was retained by the latter company, named Tegna.

Programming
As the NBC affiliate for the Minneapolis–St. Paul market, KARE clears all NBC programming on its primary channel; however, this station has a history of preempting or delaying late night programming for syndicated reruns. In 1982, channel 11 started airing an episode of M*A*S*H in between the 10 p.m. newscast and The Tonight Show. M*A*S*H would be replaced with Cheers in 1987. Tonight aired on a delay for nearly 19 years before finally being moved to the network recommended 10:35 p.m. timeslot in 2000, with Cheers placed in between Tonight and Late Night. Finally, in 2001, Late Night moved to its normal 11:35 p.m. timeslot. Channel 11 additionally ran Saturday Night Live on a half-hour delay between 1982 and 2000 with M*A*S*H (later Puttin' on the Hits, then Cheers) airing after the 10 p.m. newscast.

A locally produced children's program, Lunch with Casey, is remembered as being one of the unique contributions of the station. The show, featuring Roger Awsumb as Casey Jones, ran from 1954 until the end of 1972, with a brief reappearance in 1974. Sidekicks on the show included Joe the Cook, played by Chris Wedes, and Roundhouse Rodney, played by Lynn Dwyer. Wedes went on to play the clown J.P. Patches in Seattle, Washington, credited as partial inspiration (along with Portland, Oregon's Rusty Nails) for Krusty the Clown on The Simpsons. In 1999, the station was given the National Association of Broadcasters Service to Children Award for its locally produced programs.

The short-lived game show Let's Bowl (taped in the Twin Cities) had some episodes air on KARE in the late '90s before the program went national on Comedy Central for two seasons in 2001 and 2002. In January 2005, a local public access cable television program debuted called The Show to Be Named Later...; it is described as "The first (and only) sports talk, comedy, and variety show", somewhat of a cross between Late Night with Conan O'Brien and Fox Sports Net's The Best Damn Sports Show Period. A weekly show for teenagers called The Whatever Show (or simply Whatever) and an outdoors program known as Minnesota Bound have both aired on the station for about a decade. Former Minnesota Twin Kent Hrbek also has hosted his own outdoors show Kent Hrbek Outdoors on the station since 2004, but in the fall of 2008, Kent Hrbek Outdoors was moved over to rival Fox affiliate KMSP.

Syndicated programming
Syndicated programs broadcast by KARE include Inside Edition, Live with Kelly and Ryan, Entertainment Tonight and Jeopardy!.

For decades, both Jeopardy! and Wheel of Fortune aired on rival station WCCO-TV. However, in 1996, WCCO shifted Jeopardy! from 9:30 a.m. (where it was airing for the past ten years) to an undesired 1:37 a.m. time slot, which prompted King World (then the distributor for both game shows) to move the program to its current 4:30 p.m. time slot on KARE in 1999 to replace the defunct syndicated newsmagazine Hard Copy. During an episode of the show that aired early in its first season on the station, host Alex Trebek announced one of the categories as "the Twin Cities, where we are now airing on television station KARE in the daytime, I'm very happy to say!" Wheel remains on WCCO-TV today, making the Twin Cities one of the few TV markets in which Jeopardy! and Wheel are aired on separate stations, and not on the same station back-to-back as is standard.

News operation
KARE presently broadcasts more than 27½ hours of locally produced newscasts each week (with 4½ hours each weekday, 4 hours on Saturdays and an hour on Sundays). Unlike most NBC affiliates in large and mid-sized markets, the station does not produce a Sunday morning newscast. The 10 p.m. newscast features a "KARE 11 News Extra", an extended in-depth news story, and the station periodically produces special sports shows. The National Press Photographers Association (NPPA) has awarded KARE its "Station of the Year" honor (for large market stations) in 1985, 1995, 2000, 2006, 2007, 2008, 2010, and 2015.

In the 1980s, the station experimented with a 40-minute newscast at 10p.m., before 35-minute nightly newscasts—now the standard—became common. The station made weather history on July 18, 1986, when helicopter pilot Max Messmer was flying out to cover a news story and noticed a funnel cloud forming over the Springbrook Nature Center in Fridley. Photojournalist Tom Empey was on board the chopper and shot video of the twister. The images were broadcast live for 30 minutes on that day's 5p.m. newscast. The funnel soon formed into a full-fledged tornado as it touched the ground. In the years to come, this first aerial video of a tornado was heavily studied by meteorologists, and contributed significantly to what is known about tornado formation.

On January 10, 2011, Showcase Minnesota at 11 a.m. weekdays was replaced by KARE 11 Today, hosted by its 4 p.m. anchors Diana Pierce and Pat Evans. Besides news, KARE 11 Today includes lifestyle segments.

KARE ran a subchannel with NBC Weather Plus, which was rebranded as NBC Plus after the announcement of its planned shutdown. In mid-June 2009, KARE launched its Weather Now subchannel on .2 using WeatherNation (now AerisWeather) outsourcing company. KARE affiliated the subchannel in 2012 with the WeatherNation TV network and renewed in 2014.

Ratings
KARE has won the coveted demographic of viewers 25 to 54 years old in almost every Nielsen Ratings sweeps period since the late 1980s. The station has been able to build on NBC's prime time lead-ins, which are the lowest in the market. However, KARE has placed second overall in households at 5, 6, and 10p.m. since May 2006, trailing rival CBS owned-and-operated station WCCO. The station slipped from its top spot among women in 2007 for the first time in two decades, and factoring in KMSP-TV's 9p.m. newscast, KARE tumbled to third place overall in February 2008.

In November 2010, KARE suffered its first loss in the target 25-54 demographic during its 10p.m. newscast since 1986, with longtime runner-up WCCO-TV gaining the upper hand. However, WCCO likely benefited from a series of heavily promoted newscasts to mark the retirement of the station's longtime evening anchor involving the return of former on-air personalities during the sweeps period, leading at least one media critic to question the durability of WCCO's edge. The November 2010 numbers also showed KARE had regained second place in overall viewership. In the May 2012 ratings, KARE 11 was the most-watched news station in the key demographic of adults 25-54 throughout the day, finishing #1 at 10 p.m., 6 p.m., 5 p.m. and 6 a.m.

Notable current on-air staff
 Julie Nelson weeknights anchor
 Boyd Huppert award-winning journalist, host of Land of 10,000 Stories

Notable former on-air staff
Roger Awsumb as Casey Jones, host of Lunch With Casey children's show (1954–1972) deceased
Andre Bernier weekday morning meteorologist (1980s); later at WJW Cleveland
Asha Blake news reporter/news anchor (later at America Now)
Dennis Bounds weekend news anchor (later at KING-TV Seattle; retired)
Steve Cannon children's show host "Wrangler Steve" (1950s on shared-time WMIN-TV St. Paul); deceased
Paul Douglas meteorologist (1983–1994; later at WCCO-TV and WCCO Radio)
Bernie Grace crime news reporter (1979–2006)
Jack Horner sportscaster (1960s); later at KCBS-TV Los Angeles; deceased
Jim Lange host of Captain 11 (1954–1955); later became host of The Dating Game; deceased
Paul Magers news anchor (1983–2003; later at KCBS-TV Los Angeles; retired)
Mike Pomeranz news anchor (later on San Diego Padres shows on Fox Sports San Diego)

Technical information

Subchannels
The station's digital signal is multiplexed:

KARE's 11.2 digital subchannel, branded as KARE WX NOW, originally ran programming from NBC Weather Plus from 2005 until the network shut down in November 2008, and then ran an automated version of the network called NBC Plus until it became an affiliate of WeatherNation TV in 2011.

Translators
In addition to the main transmitter in Shoreview, KARE's signal is relayed to outlying parts of Minnesota through a network of translators. All stations PSIP to 11.1 except for Jackson, St. James and Frost which PSIP to 11.4 and K24KT, which PSIP to 24.1.

KARE formerly had a translator serving Breezy Point and Brainerd, KLKS-LP (channel 14). The repeater signed on in 1995 and operated until July 16, 2011, when its use as a repeater of KARE was discontinued due to a corporate decision made by Gannett management. The repeater was owned locally by the Lakes Broadcasting Group, owner of KLKS radio.

Coverage in Canada
KARE, along with WCCO-TV, is also carried in Canada on most cable systems in Manitoba and northwestern Ontario via Tbaytel and Shaw Cable. The stations do not make any attempt to cater to this audience, other than their inclusion on regional weather maps.

References

External links 
Lunch with Casey Jones
Minnesota Bound
TC Media Now - historical footage and documents from WTCN/WUSA/KARE	
KARE 1986 Tornado coverage
Historical photos of WTCN-TV and WTCN Radio from the Minnesota Historical Society

Television stations in Minneapolis–Saint Paul
NBC network affiliates
Court TV affiliates
True Crime Network affiliates
Quest (American TV network) affiliates
Circle (TV network) affiliates
Tegna Inc.
Metromedia
Television channels and stations established in 1953
1953 establishments in Minnesota
Minnesota Fighting Saints
National Hockey League over-the-air television broadcasters
Former Gannett subsidiaries